The Vaux Passional (Peniarth 482D) is an illuminated manuscript from the late fifteenth to early sixteenth century. With thirty-four large miniatures in the style of the Flemish School, it is one of the most elaborately decorated manuscripts in the collection of the National Library of Wales in Aberystwyth. It retains an original binding of wooden boards covered in velvet from the early sixteenth century. The volume contains the book plate of Watkin Williams of Penbedw.

The first section of the manuscript (ff. 1-185v), La Passion de Nostre Seigneur (The Passion of Our Lord), which was originally translated from Latin into French for Isabelle of Bavaria in 1398, is almost identical to several other Passion de Jésus-Christ manuscripts such as Bibliothèque de l'Arsenal MSS. 2038 and 2386, and Bibliothèque Mazarine MS. 949. Thirty-three of the thirty-four miniatures accompany this text. The presentation page (f. 9) shows Henry VII and his children, Margaret, Mary and the future Henry VIII, mourning the death of Elizabeth of York, his wife and their mother. The king is wearing robes of mourning; in the background his daughters, wearing black hoods, kneel in front of a fire; and behind them their brother Henry, dressed in a green smock, clasps his arms around his head and weeps on his mother's deathbed.

A poem Le miroir de la mort (The mirror of death) by Georges Chastellain is the second text in the manuscript (ff. 186-205v).

Gwendoline and Margaret Davies of Gregynog purchased this manuscript and donated it to the National Library in 1921. It was one of the manuscripts that were not included in the sale of the Peniarth Manuscripts to Sir John Williams.

Binding 

The Vaux Passional is a rare example in the National Library of Wales of a manuscript from the middle ages that retains its original late-medieval binding. The wooden boards, which are visible in places, are covered in crimson velvet. There are marks on the upper cover that were left by the brass bosses that adorned the volume, which was probably bound in a London workshop early in the 16th century.

Peniarth 481 is also bound in its original crimson velvet and retains the five brass bosses.

Full-page miniatures

References

External links 
 The complete Vaux Passional manuscript on the National Library of Wales website

National Library of Wales collections
Christian illuminated manuscripts
Welsh manuscripts
15th-century illuminated manuscripts